Sage Gateshead is a concert venue and musical education centre in Gateshead on the south side of the River Tyne in North East England. Opened in 2004 and occupied by North Music Trust it is part of the Gateshead Quays development which includes the Baltic Centre for Contemporary Art and the Gateshead Millennium Bridge. Its name honors a patron: the accountancy software company The Sage Group.

History 
Planning for the centre began in the early 1990s, when the orchestra of Sage Gateshead, Royal Northern Sinfonia, with encouragement from Northern Arts, began working on plans for a new concert hall. They were soon joined by regional folk music development agency Folkworks, which ensured that the needs of the region's traditional music were taken into consideration and represented in Sage Gateshead's programme of concerts, alongside Rock, Pop, Dance, Hip Hop, classical, jazz, acoustic, indie, country and world, Practice spaces for professional musicians, students and amateurs were an important part of the provision.

The planning and construction process cost over £70 million, which was raised primarily through National Lottery grants. The contractor was Laing O'Rourke. The centre has a range of patrons, notably Sage Group which contributed a large sum of money to have the building named after it. Sage plc has helped support the charitable activities of Sage Gateshead since its conception. The venue opened over the weekend 17–19 December 2004.

Sage Gateshead was developed by Foster and Partners following an architectural design competition launched in 1997 and managed by RIBA Competitions. Over 100 architects registered their interest and 12 – a mixture of local, national and international talent – were invited to prepare concept designs. A shortlist of six was then interviewed with Foster and Partners unanimously selected as the winner. The Design has gone on to win a number of awards: the RIBA Inclusive Design Award, Civic Trust Award  and The Journal North East Landmark of the Year Award.

As a conference venue, the building hosted the Labour Party's Spring conference in February 2005 and the Liberal Democrat Party conference in March 2012. On 18 August 2009, Sage Gateshead was selected to host the 2010 and 2011 National Union of Students annual conference. The 2010 Annual Conference took place 13–15 April 2010.

In 2022 The Sage Group announced that they were also sponsoring a new development that is being built next to Sage Gateshead which will be called The Sage. Sage Gateshead announced that they will be finding a new name for the venue prior to The Sage opening in 2024.

Building 
The centre occupies a curved glass and stainless steel building designed by Foster and Partners, Buro Happold (structural engineering), Mott MacDonald (engineering consultants) and Arup (acoustics), with views of Newcastle and Gateshead Quaysides, the Tyne Bridge and the Gateshead Millennium Bridge.

Sage Gateshead contains three performance spaces; a 1,700-seater, a 450-seater, and a smaller rehearsal and performance hall, the Northern Rock Foundation Hall. The rest of the building was designed around these three spaces to allow for maximum attention to detail in their acoustic properties. Structurally it is three separate buildings, insulated from each other to prevent noise and vibration travelling between them. The gaps between them may be seen as one walks around inside. A special 'spongy' concrete mix was used in the construction, with a higher-than-usual air capacity to improve the acoustic. These three buildings are enclosed (but not touched) by the now-famous glass and steel shell. Sage One was intended as an acoustically perfect space, modelled on the Musikverein in Vienna. Its ceiling panels may be raised and lowered and curtains drawn across the ribbed wooden side walls, changing the sound profile of the room to suit any type of music. Sage Two is a smaller venue, possibly the world's only ten-sided performance space.

The building is open to the public throughout the day.

Concerts
Sage Gateshead, hosts concerts from a wide range of internationally famous artists, and those who have played at the venue include Above and Beyond, Blondie, James Brown, Bonobo, Andy Cutting, De La Soul, Nick Cave, George Clinton, Bill Callahan, Crosby, Stills & Nash, Dillinger, Grace Jones, Gretchen Peters, Elbow, Explosions in the Sky, the Fall, Herbie Hancock, Mogwai, Morrissey, Mumford & Sons, Pet Shop Boys, Sunn O))), Nancy Sinatra, Snarky Puppy, Sting, Yellowman, Shane Filan of Westlife and others. In February 2015, it was one of the hosts of the second annual BBC Radio 6 Music Festival.

It is also home to Royal Northern Sinfonia, of which The Guardian wrote there is "no better chamber orchestra in Britain", and frequently hosts other visiting orchestras from around the world. The current music director for Royal Northern Sinfonia is the pianist and conductor Lars Vogt. In late 2014, Royal Northern Sinfonia collaborated with John Grant, performing at Sage Gateshead, and other venues throughout the UK. Recordings from this tour were made available as a limited edition CD and 12" record via Rough Trade Records in 2015.

Opinion
There has been popular debate surrounding Sage Gateshead. The venue is popular in the local area because of its concerts and also its accessible learning courses for all ages and its constant interaction with local schools and academies through programmes such as Sing Up and the option of school visits.

Awards 
 2019: UK National Lottery 25th Birthday Award - Best Arts, Culture and Film
 2019: Julie's Bicycle Creative Green 2 Star
 2019: Gold Standard - Attitude is Everything
 2018: Gold Award for Inclusive Tourism (North East Tourism Awards)
 2018: Gold Award for Business Tourism (Visit England Awards for Excellence)
 2005: Local Authority Building of the Year
 2005: British Construction Industry Awards
 2005: RIBA Award for Inclusive Design

See also 

 Gateshead Millennium Bridge
 Foster and Partners

References

External links

 

Tourist attractions in Tyne and Wear
Culture in Tyne and Wear
Foster and Partners buildings
High-tech architecture
Lattice shell structures
Concert halls in England
Buildings and structures in Gateshead
Music venues completed in 2004
Gateshead
Music venues in Tyne and Wear